Lyudmila Petrovna Polyakova (born January 28, 1939, Moscow) is a Soviet and Russian actress; she is a People's Artist of Russia (1999).

Biography 
She graduated in 1964 from the Mikhail Shchepkin Higher Theatre School (course of Viktor Korshunov).

In the movie it is removed since 1967.

Since 1990, she has been an actress of Maly Theatre (Moscow).

Awards
 Order For Merit to the Fatherland (2010)
 Order of Friendship (2006)
 People's Artist of Russia (1999)
 Honored Artist of the Russian Federation (1994)
 State Prize of the Russian Federation (2003)

Selected filmography 
 Beginning of the Unknown Century (1967) as Pregnant peasant woman
 Agony (1974) as Paraskeva, Rasputin's wife
 An Almost Funny Story (1977) as a client at the hairdresser
 Farewell (1983) as Darya's friend
Humiliated and Insulted  (1991) as Anna Ikhmeneva
 Bimmer (2003) as Sobachikha
 High Security Vacation (2009) as  Zinaida Obraztsova
 Once Upon a Time There Lived a Simple Woman (2011) as Paramonovna
 You All Infuriate Me (2017) as doctor

References

External links

1939 births
Living people
Soviet film actresses
Soviet stage actresses
Russian stage actresses
Russian film actresses
Russian television actresses
People's Artists of Russia
Honored Artists of the Russian Federation
State Prize of the Russian Federation laureates
Actresses from Moscow
20th-century Russian actresses
21st-century Russian actresses